The Gibbons Lodge, also known as the President's House or the Helen Gibbons House, is a residence for the University of Western Ontario's president located in the neighbourhood of Uplands in London, Ontario, Canada. The residence is located on a  property which borders Richmond Street and overlooks the University of Western Ontario. Helen Gibbons daughter of a prominent lawyer, Sir George C. Gibbons purchased the property in 1928. The house was built in 1932 by a local builder, Charles Oram. After Miss. Gibbons death (1960), the house was donated to The University of Western Ontario’s Board of Governors, and the surrounding land purchased in 1961 by the University for $150,000. The mansion has served as University of Western Ontario president's residence since the property was purchased in 1960.

See also 
 Presidents House

References

Further reading

External links 

 University Official website

Buildings and structures in London, Ontario
University of Western Ontario